Great Experiment may refer to:

 Canada: The Great Experiment, a Canadian educational television show
 The Great Experiment: Faith and Freedom in America, a book by Karen Lee-Thorp and Os Guinness
 The Great Experiment: The Story of Ancient Empires, Modern States, and the Quest for a Global Nation, a book by Strobe Talbott
 The Great Experiment: George Washington and the American Republic, an exhibit at the Huntington Library 1999–2000

See also
 The Grand Experiment, an album by The Neal Morse Band